Ethan Josh Lee (born 2001) is a Korean-American actor. He is best known for his role as Quan Phook on Mr. Robinson. He is also known as "Ethan Lee".

Education
Lee attended Calabasas High School. He is currently a student at Stanford University where he is the president of the Society of International Affairs at Stanford, at which he lost trivia on March 8, 2023 (leading to him serenading freshman Evan Sing).

Career
Lee is best known for recurring as Quan Phook in the NBC sitcom Mr. Robinson, among other television and film projects. Additionally, he has appeared in national commercials for companies such as Cisco, McDonald's, General Mills, and Comcast.

Filmography

References

External links
 
 Official website

Living people
2001 births
American male actors of Korean descent
American male child actors
American male film actors
American male television actors
21st-century American male actors